Steadroy "Cutie" Benjamin is an Antiguan lawyer and politician, who is the current minister of Justice and Attorney General of Antigua and Barbuda. He previously served as Leader of the Opposition in the Parliament of Antigua and Barbuda.

A lawyer by training, Benjamin represented Ivor Bird, the brother of Prime Minister Lester Bird, following his arrest for the attempted smuggling of cocaine. He was then returned as the Member of Parliament for St John's City South, representing Bird's Labour Party, and was re-elected during the 1999 general election with 845 votes, defeating the United Progressive Party candidate Vaughn Walter. He was then sworn in, on 12 March, as Minister of Planning, Implementation and Public Service Affairs. Later that year he was transferred, becoming Minister of Labour, Home Affairs and Co-operatives. In 2001 his position was expanded with the stripping of internal security power from Errol Cort, the Attorney General of Antigua and Barbuda, and the granting of this portfolio to Benjamin.

As Minister for Labour, Benjamin was responsible for introducing the Sir George Walter (Pension and Other Benefits) Act 2002, which sought to grant Sir George Walter, the second Premier of Antigua and Barbuda, and father of the aforementioned Vaughn Walter, a pension of 10,000 East Caribbean dollars a month, and announced that non-Antiguans who lived in Antigua for three years or more would not be required to obtain permits to work. Following the 2004 general election, Benjamin was one of only four Labour Party MPs to keep his seat, and was sworn into the new Parliament on 29 March 2004. Although initially supporting Robin Yearwood as Leader of the Opposition, Benjamin later withdrew his support, as did two other Labour MPs, Gaston Browne and Asot Michael; the group suggested Benjamin as a replacement leader. Benjamin was later appointed Leader of the Opposition, overseeing the removal of Lennox Weston from the Senate, and was later appointed Shadow Minister for justice, legal affairs, the Attorney-General's office and crime.

References

Antigua and Barbuda Labour Party politicians
Members of the House of Representatives (Antigua and Barbuda)
Living people
Antigua and Barbuda lawyers
Government ministers of Antigua and Barbuda
Year of birth missing (living people)
Attorneys general of Antigua and Barbuda